"Holla at Me" is the debut single by American musician DJ Khaled featuring American rappers Lil Wayne, Paul Wall, Fat Joe, Rick Ross, and Pitbull, released in 2006 from the former's debut studio album Listennn... the Album. Produced by Cool & Dre, it samples Afrika Bambaataa & the Soulsonic Force's 1983 song "Looking for the Perfect Beat".

Chart performance
"Holla at Me" debuted and peaked at number 59 on the US Billboard Hot 100 the week of June 24, 2006. It stayed on the chart for four weeks. It also peaked at number 15 on the US Hot Rap Tracks chart in June 2006.

Music video
Jim Jones, Birdman, Johnny Dang, Slim Thug, Remy Ma, Trina, Trick Daddy, DJ Drama, Scott Storch, DJ Clue, Cool & Dre, DJ Felli Fel and DMX all make cameo appearances in the video.

Charts

References

External links
[ "Holla at Me"] at Allmusic

2005 songs
2006 debut singles
DJ Khaled songs
Lil Wayne songs
Paul Wall songs
Rick Ross songs
Fat Joe songs
Pitbull (rapper) songs
Songs written by DJ Khaled
Songs written by Pitbull (rapper)
Songs written by Arthur Baker (musician)
Songs written by John Robie
Song recordings produced by Cool & Dre
MNRK Music Group singles